Rutierele (singular rutieră) are private, owner-operated minibuses in Moldova that are used in public transport. They operate along fixed routes.

In cities the each rutieră route has a given number, like buses or trolleybuses.

Rutierele are very popular in cities of Moldova and were introduced in 1981.

Lines

See also
Marshrutka
Maxi-taxi
minibus

Road transport in Moldova
Transport